Argul is a village in Jakranpalle mandal, Nizamabad district, Telangana, India.  the population of the village was 4,026 people spread over 932 households.

References

Villages in Nizamabad district